Purple Hill is a  biological Site of Special Scientific Interest south of Gillingham in Kent. It is a Nature Conservation Review site, Grade 2. 

This chalk downland site has herb-rich grassland, scrub and woods. Flora include the nationally rare Kentish milkwort and several uncommon orchids.

The site is private land with no public access.

References

Sites of Special Scientific Interest in Kent
Nature Conservation Review sites